Maria Komnene (c. 1144 – 1190) was Queen of Hungary and Croatia from 1163 until 1165. Maria's father was Isaac Komnenos (son of John II).

Marriage
She married c. 1157 to King Stephen IV of Hungary (c. 1133 – 11 April 1165). They did not have any children.

Sources 
 Kristó Gyula - Makk Ferenc: Az Árpád-ház uralkodói (IPC Könyvek, 1996)
 Korai Magyar Történeti Lexikon (9-14. század), főszerkesztő: Kristó Gyula, szerkesztők: Engel Pál és Makk Ferenc (Akadémiai Kiadó, Budapest, 1994)

Hungarian queens consort
1140s births
1190 deaths
Maria
12th-century Byzantine women
12th-century Hungarian women
12th-century Byzantine people
12th-century Hungarian people